Alan Sneddon (born 12 March 1958) is a Scottish former footballer, who played as a defender for Celtic, Hibernian, Motherwell and East Fife in the Scottish Football League.

Sneddon won the 1980 Scottish Cup Final with Celtic. He then earned the unusual achievement of winning two league winners' medals in the same season in 1981, as he played enough games for both Celtic, who won the Premier Division, and Hibernian, who won the First Division, to qualify for a medal from each championship.

Sneddon played for over 10 years for Hibernian, playing in over 300 league games. This long service meant that he was awarded a testimonial match, which was played against Aston Villa  in 1991.

References 

Sources

External links 

1958 births
Footballers from Glasgow
People from Baillieston
Celtic F.C. players
East Fife F.C. players
Association football defenders
Hibernian F.C. players
Living people
Motherwell F.C. players
Scottish Football League players
Scottish footballers
Larkhall Thistle F.C. players
Scotland under-21 international footballers
Scottish Junior Football Association players